The Stone cross in the memory of the people killed by Bolsheviks is a monument in Răzeni, Moldova.

Overview
The memorial is dedicated to the victims of the Răzeni Massacre. The massacre took place on June 22, 1941, in Răzeni, when 10 people were killed by the Soviet authorities and buried in a mass grave. The memorial was opened on February 21, 2009; Moldovan politician Alexandru Tănase was present. 

In 1941 after Operation Barbarossa, when the area came under the control of the pro-Nazi Antonescu regime, a commemorative plaque was installed in Răzeni: "Aici odihnesc robii lui Dumnezeu Diomid, Niculai, Dănila, Nichita, Alexandru, Jurian, Alexandru, Ilie, doi necunoscuți. Omorâți mișelește de bolșevici comuniști. 12.VII.1941".

See also
Mass killings under Communist regimes

Notes

External links
 Cruce de piatră la Rezeni în memoria celor omorâți de bolșevici 
 În memoriam... 

 

Monuments and memorials in Moldova
1941 in the Soviet Union
2009 in Moldova
2009 sculptures
Memorials to victims of communism
Anti-communism in Moldova
Political repression
1941 in the Moldavian Soviet Socialist Republic